"Secret Love" is a song by musical group the Bee Gees. It was released as the lead single from their 19th studio album, High Civilization (1991), on 18 February 1991. It is an up-tempo song with a Supremes style similar to the 1986 Diana Ross hit "Chain Reaction", which was also written by the Bee Gees. The single reached the top 10 in several European countries but was not released as a single in the United States.

Track listings
7-inch and cassette single
 "Secret Love" (LP version)
 "True Confessions"

12-inch and CD single
 "Secret Love" (LP version)
 "True Confessions"
 "Human Sacrifice"

Japanese mini-CD single
 "Secret Love"
 "Human Sacrifice"

Charts

Weekly charts

Year-end charts

See also
 List of European number-one airplay songs of the 1990s

References

Bee Gees songs
1990 songs
1991 singles
Songs written by Barry Gibb
Songs written by Maurice Gibb
Songs written by Robin Gibb
Warner Records singles